Vesna Girardi-Jurkić (15 January 1944 – 25 August 2012) was a Croatian archeologist and museologist. She formerly served as the Croatian Minister of Education, Culture and Sport in the period between April 1992 and October 1994 in the cabinets of Prime Ministers Franjo Gregurić, Hrvoje Šarinić and Nikica Valentić. She was the first woman to be appointed a minister in a Croatian cabinet since independence.

Born in Zagreb in 1944, her family moved to Pula in 1947, where she finished high school. Girardi-Jurkić went on to graduate from the Faculty of Humanities and Social Sciences at the University of Zagreb in 1968, majoring in archeology and English. Between 1969 and 1991 she held various positions at the Archeological Museum of Istria in Pula. In 1992 she was appointed Minister of Education, Culture and Sport and held the post until 1994, when she was named Croatia's Permanent Delegate to UNESCO.

In 2001 she briefly returned to the Archeological Museum of Istria before going on to head the International Research Centre for Archaeology Brijuni-Medulin. Her primary interest is the study of archeological sites from classical antiquity around Istria. She authored several books about the subject.

References

External links
 Vesna Girardi-Jurkić biography 

1944 births
2012 deaths
Scientists from Zagreb
Faculty of Humanities and Social Sciences, University of Zagreb alumni
Culture ministers of Croatia
Croatian Democratic Union politicians
Permanent Delegates of Croatia to UNESCO
Croatian archaeologists
Education ministers of Croatia
People from Pula
Women government ministers of Croatia
Croatian women diplomats
Croatian women ambassadors
Croatian women archaeologists